Bavarilla is an extinct genus of trilobites.

References

External links 
 Bavarilla at the Paleobiology Database

Ordovician trilobites of Africa
Phacopida genera
Calymenina
Fezouata Formation fossils